Myrmedobia is a genus of minute bladder bugs in the family Microphysidae. There are about five described species in Myrmedobia.

Species
These five species belong to the genus Myrmedobia:
 Myrmedobia coleoptrata (Fallén, 1807)
 Myrmedobia distinguenda Reuter, 1884
 Myrmedobia exilis (Fallén, 1807)
 Myrmedobia inconspicua (Douglas & Scott, 1871)
 † Loricula pericarti Popov, 2004

References

Further reading

 
 

Cimicomorpha genera
Articles created by Qbugbot
Microphysidae